Mehmet Ozan Dolunay (born 2 May 1990) is a Turkish actor.
He is known for his role as Mert in Star TV series Yüksek Sosyete opposite  Meriç Aral and Cenk Karaçay in Kanal D series Zalim istanbul .

Life and career 
Dolunay was born in 1990 in Ankara. After finishing his studies at Enka High School and Cleveland Heights High School, he enrolled in Koç University, pursuing a major in mechanical engineering. While he was studying, he began to take acting lessons at Craft Acting Workshops, and had his debut on television with the series Tatlı Küçük Yalancılar. His first professional experience on stage came with a role in the play Killology. For his performance in this play, he was nominated as the Best Young Talent at both Afife Jale Awards and Üstün Akmen Awards, the latter of which he won. He continued his career in television with  a supporting role in Oyunbozan and a major role because of which he was recognized internationally in Yüksek Sosyete, later he was cast as lead actor in Lise Devriyesi. He further rose to prominence with his role in the series Zalim İstanbul as Cenk Karaçay, who became the most popular character on social media month after month.

Filmography

Theatre

Awards and nominations

References

External links 
 
 

1990 births
Living people
Turkish male television actors
Turkish male film actors